Tina Connolly  is an American science fiction and fantasy writer and poet. Her 2012 book Ironskin was nominated for the Nebula Award for Best Novel. Her flash fiction podcast "Toasted Cake" won the Parsec Award for Best New Speculative Fiction Podcaster/Team.

Her novelette "The Last Banquet of Temporal Confections", published by Tor.com, was a finalist for the Hugo Award for Best Novelette.

Works

Novels
 Ironskin (Tor, 2012)
 Copperhead (Tor, 2013)
 Silverblind (Tor, 2014)
 Seriously Wicked (Tor, 2015)
 Seriously Shifted (Tor, 2016)
 Seriously Hexed (Tor, 2017)

Awards

 2017 World Fantasy Award for Best Collection for On the Eyeball Floor and Other Stories (nominee)

References

External links 

 
 

Living people
American science fiction writers
Novelists from Missouri
21st-century American novelists
Date of birth missing (living people)
American women novelists
21st-century American women writers
Women science fiction and fantasy writers
Year of birth missing (living people)